Vinícius Lopes da Silva (born 7 May 1999) is a Brazilian professional footballer who plays as a forward for RWD Molenbeek on loan from Botafogo.

Professional career
Lopes joined the youth academy of Goiás in 2016, which was 836 km away from his hometown Monte do Carmo. Lopes made his professional debut with Goiás in a 2-2 Campeonato Brasileiro Série A tie with Chapecoense on 20 October 2019.

References

External links
 

1999 births
Living people
Sportspeople from Tocantins
Brazilian footballers
Association football forwards
Campeonato Brasileiro Série A players
Campeonato Brasileiro Série B players
Goiás Esporte Clube players
Botafogo de Futebol e Regatas players